Telmo Manuel Machado Pinto (born 18 January 1971) is a former Portuguese football player. He is currently the president of the junta de freguesia of Quarteira, elected from the Socialist Party.

Club career
He made his professional debut in the Primeira Liga for União de Leiria on 19 August 1995 as a second-half substitute in a 0–4 loss against Marítimo.

He scored 4 goals for União de Leiria in the 1995 UEFA Intertoto Cup campaign.

References

1971 births
People from Loulé
Living people
Portuguese footballers
Louletano D.C. players
U.D. Leiria players
Primeira Liga players
F.C. Paços de Ferreira players
Liga Portugal 2 players
Associação Académica de Coimbra – O.A.F. players
S.C. Espinho players
A.D. Esposende players
F.C. Penafiel players
Portuguese politicians
Socialist Party (Portugal) politicians
Association football midfielders